Trachyliopus fuscosignatus is a species of beetle in the family Cerambycidae. It was described by Fairmaire in 1886.

References

Crossotini
Beetles described in 1886